Stephen, Steven or Steve Langdon may refer to:

 Stephen Herbert Langdon (1876–1937), American-born British Assyriologist
 Steven W. Langdon (born 1946), Canadian politician and economist
 Steve J. Langdon (born 1948), American anthropologist
 Steve Langdon (ice hockey) (born 1953), Canadian former ice-hockey player with the Boston Bruins
 Stephen Langdon, the Abbot of Tavistock in 1362

See also
 Stephen Langton ( – 1228), English Cardinal of the Roman Catholic Church and Archbishop of Canterbury